Maria Sergeyevna Motuznaya (born August 26, 1994) is a Russian blogger and activist. She came to public attention in 2018 when she explained on Twitter why she is on Russia's official list of extremists and terrorists.

Biography
She was born on 26 August 1994. She was brought up by her mother, an Orthodox Christian. Motuznaya is studying for a film director. In the coming months she planned to go to China, still to learn, and then, perhaps, to stay there to work.

In 8 May 2018, the police unexpectedly came to her with a search. So Motuznaya learned that she was accused of two articles of the Criminal Code in insulting the feelings of believers, as well as in inciting hatred or enmity. The basis for the accusations was that the girl in 2015 kept to herself in the albums VKontakte pictures of memes on the themes of religion and memes, which dealt with blacks.

In her opinion, the real reason for her persecution is her social activities. She repeatedly published in social networks announcements of opposition rallies, in particular the shares of Alexei Navalny.

In October 2018, she announced her emigration from Russia in order to obtain political asylum in one of the European countries.

In January 2019, the case against Motuznaya was discontinued.

In March 2022, Motuznaya criticized AssezJeune's reasons to remove the red stripe in regards to the white-blue-white flag.

References

External links
 Экстремисты на потоке. Как силовики Алтая делают план на мемах
 Maria Motuznaya on VKontakte
 

1994 births
21st-century Russian women writers
People from Barnaul
Living people
Russian activists against the 2022 Russian invasion of Ukraine
Russian atheists
Russian bloggers
Russian women activists
Russian women bloggers
Russian dissidents
Russian Internet celebrities
Russian prisoners and detainees